Three ships and two shore installations of the Royal Australian Navy have been named HMAS Penguin after the aquatic, flightless bird:

 , a composite sloop originally commissioned by the Royal Navy, before being transferred to the RAN in 1913 as a depot ship
 HMAS Penguin, a second-class protected cruiser, that was renamed Penguin in 1923 when it was converted to accommodations
The ship was renamed Platypus in 1941.
 HMAS Penguin, the Royal Australian Navy's primary naval base on the east coast of Australia, located on Garden Island in Sydney, was known as HMAS Penguin until it was renamed  in January 1943.
 , one of the RAN's major training establishments, located in Balmoral, New South Wales.

Three other bases were established as subordinate to the Garden Island base. These were also given the name HMAS Penguin, but with a Roman numeral suffix added:

 HMAS Penguin II, naval base at Balmoral, New South Wales, until renamed  in January 1943

See also

Royal Australian Navy ship names